Flute Springs is a census-designated place (CDP) in Sequoyah County, Oklahoma, United States. It is part of the Fort Smith, Arkansas-Oklahoma Metropolitan Statistical Area. The population was 182 at the 2000 census.

Geography
Flute Springs is located at  (35.622245, -94.800662).

Demographics

As of the census of 2000, there were 182 people, 62 households, and 49 families residing in the CDP. There were 65 housing units at an average density of 14.9/sq mi (5.7/km2). The racial makeup of the CDP was 28.02% White, 61.54% Native American, and 10.44% from two or more races. Hispanic or Latino of any race were 0.55% of the population.

There were 62 households, out of which 24.2% had children under the age of 18 living with them, 54.8% were married couples living together, 17.7% had a female householder with no husband present, and 19.4% were non-families. 17.7% of all households were made up of individuals, and 9.7% had someone living alone who was 65 years of age or older. The average household size was 2.94 and the average family size was 3.20.

In the CDP, the population was spread out, with 21.4% under the age of 18, 12.6% from 18 to 24, 23.1% from 25 to 44, 30.2% from 45 to 64, and 12.6% who were 65 years of age or older. The median age was 40 years. For every 100 females, there were 127.5 males. For every 100 females age 18 and over, there were 120.0 males.

The median income for a household in the CDP was $23,594, and the median income for a family was $23,929. Males had a median income of $22,500 versus $12,857 for females. The per capita income for the CDP was $9,789. About 17.7% of families and 31.0% of the population were below the poverty line, including 40.7% of those under the age of eighteen and 35.7% of those 65 or over.

References

Census-designated places in Sequoyah County, Oklahoma
Census-designated places in Oklahoma
Fort Smith metropolitan area
Cherokee towns in Oklahoma